Don Thup station is a railway station located in Khanthuli Subdistrict, Tha Chana District, Surat Thani.

Services 
 Local No. 445/446 Chumphon-Hat Yai Junction-Chumphon

References 
 
 

Railway stations in Thailand
Surat Thani province